1059 Mussorgskia, provisional designation , is a background asteroid from the central regions of the asteroid belt, approximately  in diameter. It was discovered on 19 July 1925, by Soviet astronomer Vladimir Albitsky at the Simeiz Observatory on the Crimean peninsula. The asteroid was named for Russian composer Modest Mussorgsky. The X- or C-type asteroid has a rotation period of 5.636 hours.

Orbit and classification 

Mussorgskia is a non-family asteroid from the main belt's background population. It orbits the Sun in the central asteroid belt at a distance of 2.1–3.1 AU once every 4 years and 3 months (1,567 days; semi-major axis of 2.64 AU). Its orbit has an eccentricity of 0.19 and an inclination of 10° with respect to the ecliptic.

Physical characteristics 

Mussorgskia has been characterized as a common X-type asteroid by Pan-STARRS photometric survey. It is also characterized as a carbonaceous C-type asteroid in the SDSS-MFB (Masi Foglia Binzel) taxonomy.

Rotation period 

In May 2002, two rotational lightcurves of Mussorgskia were obtained from photometric observations by Stephen Brincat at the Flarestar Observatory in Malta and by French amateur astronomer René Roy. Lightcurve analysis gave a rotation period of 5.519 and 5.6362 hours with a brightness amplitude of 0.20 and 0.21 magnitude, respectively. The Collaborative Asteroid Lightcurve Link adopts a period of 5.636 hours and a brightness variation between 0.2 and 0.21 magnitude.

Diameter and albedo 

According to the surveys carried out by the Japanese Akari satellite and the NEOWISE mission of NASA's Wide-field Infrared Survey Explorer, Mussorgskia measures between 17.54 and 30.323 kilometers in diameter  and its surface has an albedo between 0.1010 and 0.23.

CALL assumes a standard albedo for carbonaceous asteroids of 0.057 and consequently calculates a larger diameter of 36.78 kilometers based on an absolute magnitude of 10.9.

Naming 

This minor planet was named after Russian composer (1839–1881). The official  was published by the Minor Planet Center in November 1952.

Notes

References

External links 
 SDSS Masi–Foglia–Binzel Spectroscopic classification
 Asteroid Lightcurve Database (LCDB), query form (info )
 Dictionary of Minor Planet Names, Google books
 Asteroids and comets rotation curves, CdR – Observatoire de Genève, Raoul Behrend
 Discovery Circumstances: Numbered Minor Planets (1)-(5000) – Minor Planet Center
 
 

001059
Discoveries by Vladimir Albitsky
Named minor planets
19250719